Saleem Yousuf (born 7 December 1959) is a former Pakistani international cricketer who played in 32 Test matches and 86 One Day Internationals between 1982 and 1990. He was a wicketkeeper. He made his highest Test score of 91 not out against England at Edgbaston in 1987. One of his most memorable innings was in a match against the West Indies in the 1987 World Cup, which turned certain defeat into victory for Pakistan.

In 1990, Saleem Yousuf became the first wicketkeeper to record three stumpings in an ODI innings and still jointly holds the record for the most stumpings in a single ODI innings.

Post-retirement
After retirement, he served on the Selection Committee for the Pakistan Cricket Board. He presently serves as Principal Appraiser in the Pakistan Customs Service.

He is currently one of the members of the Advisory board of PSL's franchise Karachi Kings.

References

External links

1959 births
Living people
Pakistan Test cricketers
Pakistan One Day International cricketers
Cricketers at the 1987 Cricket World Cup
Pakistani cricketers
Cricketers from Karachi
Sindh cricketers
Karachi B cricketers
Industrial Development Bank of Pakistan cricketers
Allied Bank Limited cricketers
Karachi Whites cricketers
Karachi cricketers
Pakistan Customs cricketers
Karachi Blues cricketers
Wicket-keepers